Zero Deposit is a UK based deposit-free renting platform with its headquarters in Hertfordshire, UK. It provides an insurance backed guarantee underwritten by Equitable Rental Insurance Limited is and regulated by the Financial Conduct Authority (FCA), which allows tenants to pay less upfront when renting.

History
Co-founded by Jon Notley, a former Commercial director at Zoopla, Gavin Wiseman and Ben Austin, Zero Deposit is the trading name of Global Property Ventures Limited. Simon Embley is the current Chairman.
The Zero Deposit Guarantee is an option instead of the traditional rental cash deposit, in the form of an insurance backed guarantee paid for by the tenant. Instead of paying a cash deposit, tenants pay a premium equal to one week’s rent to move into their new home. The landlord is protected against financial loss up to the value of six weeks’ rent.

Partnership
Zero Deposit is partnered with thousands of letting agents across England and Wales as well as the national landlord association and the residential landlord association. It has also partnered with the London estate agency Chestertons to provide its deposit replacement product across their 33 branches. A number of letting agencies, including Countrywide, Connells, Douglas and Gordon, Foxtons, Barnard Marcus, Knight Frank, John D Wood, Acorn Group, and KFH have signed up to Zero Deposit to provide their customers with deposit replacement scheme.

See also
 Insurance
 Renting

References

External links
 Official website

Financial services companies of the United Kingdom
Companies based in Hertfordshire